Zoran Mustur (Serbian Cyrillic: Зоран Мустур) is a former water polo player. As a member of Yugoslavia's water polo team he won a silver medal at the 1980 Summer Olympics.

See also
 List of Olympic medalists in water polo (men)

References

External links
 

1953 births
Living people
Yugoslav male water polo players
Olympic medalists in water polo
Olympic silver medalists for Yugoslavia
Olympic water polo players of Yugoslavia
Water polo players at the 1980 Summer Olympics
Medalists at the 1980 Summer Olympics
Sportspeople from Rijeka
Mediterranean Games medalists in water polo
Mediterranean Games gold medalists for Yugoslavia
Competitors at the 1979 Mediterranean Games